Hiramandalam is a census town in Srikakulam district of the Indian state of Andhra Pradesh. It is also the mandal headquarters of Hiramandalam mandal in Palakonda revenue division. BRR Project Located at Hiramandalam town. It is located 49 km towards North from District headquarters Srikakulam.

Geography
It has an average elevation of 27 meters (91 feet).

Demographics
According to Indian census, 2001, the demographic details of Hiramandalam mandal is as follows:
 Total Population: 	46,204	in 11,055 Households
 Male Population: 	22,954	and Female Population: 	23,250		
 Children Under 6 Yrs: 6,347	(Boys -	3,162	and Girls - 3,185)
 Total Literates: 	22,780

Education
The primary and secondary school education is imparted by government, aided and private schools, under the School Education Department of the state. The medium of instruction followed by different schools are English, Telugu.

References 

Census towns in Andhra Pradesh
Mandal headquarters in Srikakulam district